Abel Ortíz (born c.1909) was an Argentine sports shooter. He competed in the 300 m rifle event at the 1948 Summer Olympics.

References

External links
 

Year of birth missing
Year of death missing
Argentine male sport shooters
Olympic shooters of Argentina
Shooters at the 1948 Summer Olympics
Place of birth missing